Mogale Paul Thomas Nkumishe (28 February 1938 – 29 June 2012) was the Roman Catholic bishop of the Roman Catholic Diocese of Polokwane, South Africa.

Nkhumishe, the son of Cornelius and Agatha Motlhago Nkhumishe, was born in Klein Nyls Oog near the town of Nylstroom. Ordained to the priesthood in 1967, Nkhumishe was named a titular bishop in 1981; he resigned in 2011.

He was appointed Bishop of Lydenburg-Witbank on 9 Jan 1984, a post he held until 17 Feb 2000 when he became Bishop of Pietersburg (renamed in 2009 to Polokwane).

He had his primary education in Vaalbos primary school from 1948 to 1953. He then moved to Bela Bela Catholic School where he studied from 1954 to 1956. It is here that he slowly discovered his vocation to priesthood.

See also

Notes

20th-century Roman Catholic bishops in South Africa
1938 births
2012 deaths
21st-century Roman Catholic bishops in South Africa
Roman Catholic bishops of Polokwane
Roman Catholic bishops of Witbank